Coptops purpureomixta is a species of beetle in the family Cerambycidae. It was described by Maurice Pic in 1926, originally under the genus Mutatocoptops. It is known from Vietnam.

References

purpureomixta
Beetles described in 1926